The 1990 NCAA Division I baseball season, play of college baseball in the United States organized by the National Collegiate Athletic Association (NCAA) began in the spring of 1990.  The season progressed through the regular season and concluded with the 1990 College World Series.  The College World Series, held for the forty fourth time in 1990, consisted of one team from each of eight regional competitions and was held in Omaha, Nebraska, at Johnny Rosenblatt Stadium as a double-elimination tournament.  Georgia claimed the championship for the first time.

Format change
The Big East Conference dissolved its divisional format and played as a single eight team division.

Conference winners
This is a partial list of conference champions from the 1990 season.  The NCAA sponsored regional competitions to determine the College World Series participants.  Each of the eight regionals consisted of six teams competing in double-elimination tournaments, with the winners advancing to Omaha.  25 teams earned automatic bids by winning their conference championship while 23 teams earned at-large selections.

Conference standings
The following is an incomplete list of conference standings:

College World Series

The 1990 season marked the forty fourth NCAA Baseball Tournament, which culminated with the eight team College World Series.  The College World Series was held in Omaha, Nebraska.  The eight teams played a double-elimination format, with Georgia claiming their first championship with a 2–1 win over Oklahoma State in the final.

Award winners

All-America team

References